A list of films produced in France in 1911.

See also
 1911 in France

External links
 French films of 1911 at the Internet Movie Database

1911
Lists of 1911 films by country or language
Films